The 1890 Epsom Derby was a horse race which took place at Epsom Downs on 2 June 1890. It was the 110th running of the Derby, and it was won by Sainfoin. The winner was ridden by John Watts and trained by John Porter.

Race details
 Prize money to winner: £5930
 Number of runners: 8
 Winner's time: 2m 49.8s

Full result

* The distances between the horses are shown in lengths or shorter. shd = short-head; hd = head; PU = pulled up.

Winner's details
Further details of the winner, Sainfoin:

 Foaled: 1887
 Sire: Springfield; Dam: Sanda (Wenlock)
 Owner: Sir James Miller
 Breeder: Hampton Court Stud

References

 Race Report - Otago Witness

Epsom Derby
 1890
Epsom Derby
19th century in Surrey
Epsom Derby